Over and Over is a greatest hits album by Japanese electronica/rock band Boom Boom Satellites. The album is itself a shorter version of their previous compilation 19972007, but exclusively released to the United States rather than to Japan, to coincide with their American tour, which includes a stop at New York Comic Con. The album was initially released digitally to the iTunes Store on September 14, 2010, and then physically on CD on October 19, 2010.

Track listing

References

External links
 Boom Boom Satellites official website

Boom Boom Satellites albums
2010 compilation albums